Khuzdar Airport  is situated 5 km away from city centre of Khuzdar, Balochistan, Pakistan. Currently, there are no scheduled flights to or from the airport.

See also 
 List of airports in Pakistan

References

External links
Khuzdar Airport at Executive Air International Services

Airports in Balochistan, Pakistan
Khuzdar District